Hegerberg is a surname. Notable people with the surname include:

Ada Hegerberg (born 1995), Norwegian women's footballer
Andrine Hegerberg (born 1993), Norwegian women's footballer
Egil Hegerberg (born 1970), Norwegian comedian and musician

Norwegian-language surnames